Barking is a late-night sketch comedy show broadcast on Channel 4 in the summer of 1998. It starred and was written by David Walliams, Catherine Tate, Peter Kay, Omid Djalili, Mackenzie Crook, Marcus Brigstocke and more up-and-coming comedians, most of whom went on to successful careers.

The show was released on DVD on 7 November 2011.

Cast

Episodes

Reception 
Despite the impressive array of future successful comedy stars, the show was not a ratings hit. In the Radio Times Guide to TV Comedy (1998), critic Mark Lewisohn said, "the ideas with good potential were buried under a mountain of mediocrity... the show's clash of styles, pacing and mood worked heavily against them". However, he cited Marcus Brigstocke's psychotic airline pilot and David Walliams's insane royal watcher as standout characters.

Brian Donaldson of The List described the show as "something of a mixed bag" and noted that "there's a healthy amount of decent moments". He concluded, "Barking was never as mad as it thought it was and the show's bite was largely toothless".

References

External links
 
 

1990s British television sketch shows
1998 British television series debuts
1998 British television series endings
Channel 4 sketch shows